The King's Volunteer Reserves Medal (KVRM) was created by Royal Warrant of Queen Elizabeth II on 29 March 1999. Only 13 King's Volunteer Reserves Medals may be awarded in a year (although it appears more have been issued in some years - as of 2018, more than the 13 were awarded in 8 of the medal's 20-year history: 19 medals were awarded in 2011; 16 in 2003 and 2000; 14 in 2018, 2017, 2013, 2009 and 2002).  The medal is presented only to members of the Volunteer Reserves of the British Armed Services for exemplary meritorious service in the conduct of their duties. The KVRM is a Level 3 award and ranks in military order of wear immediately after the British Empire Medal. It is the first exclusive award to Volunteer Reserves that is presented at an investiture. The first awards were announced in the 1999 Queen's Birthday Honours with these first awards presented at an investiture on 5 November 1999.

Medal
The medal is circular and made of silver coloured metal.  The obverse bears the sovereign's effigy surrounded by the inscription ELIZABETH II DEI GRATIA REGINA FID DEF.  The reverse depicts a scroll with the inscription The Queen's Volunteer Reserves Medal. The ribbon is dark green with three narrow gold stripes.  Receipt of this medal is entitles the holder to use the post-nominals KVRM. There are no clasps awarded for this medal.

See also
British and Commonwealth orders and decorations
Military awards and decorations of the United Kingdom
QVRM Association Website

References

Military awards and decorations of the United Kingdom